Malvalic acid is a cyclopropene fatty acid found in  baobab seed oil and cottonseed oil. The cyclopropene ring is thought to be one of the causes of abnormalities that develop in animals that ingest cottonseed oil. Refining processes, such as hydrogenation, can remove or destroy malvalic acid.

Biosynthesis
The biosynthesis of malvalic acid starts with oleic acid, an 18-carbon monounsaturated fatty acid, leading to sterculic acid. An α-oxidation reaction removes one carbon from the chain to form the 17-carbon-chain structure of malvalic acid.

History
Wilson et al. demonstrated the co-occurrence of malvalic acid and the corresponding cyclopropane acids in several types of seeds. He suggested that methylene addition to oleic acid gave rise to dihydrosterculic acid, which was desaturated to sterculic acid, and that 8-heptadecenoic acid was similarly the precursor of dihydromalvalic acid and malvalic acid. Smith and Bu'Lock showed that in Hibiscus seedlings the chains of sterculic and malvalic acids, but not the ring methylene carbon, were derived from acetate. They showed that the labeling pattern in malvalic acid was the same as that in sterculic acid minus the carboxyl carbon. They explained the shortening by α oxidation occurring during the biogenesis of malvalic acid. Hooper and Law demonstrated that the ring methylene carbon of both cyclopropane and cyclopropene acids was derived from the methyl group of methionine in Hibiscus, and suggested from the distribution of label that the pathway was oleic → dihydrosterculic → sterculic acid.

References

Fatty acids
Cyclopropenes
Cotton